Events from the year 1576 in Portuguese Macau.

Incumbents
 Captains-Major - Vasco Pereira, Domingos Monteiro

Events

January
 23 January - The establishment of Roman Catholic Diocese of Macau.

References

1576 in China
1576 in the Portuguese Empire
Macau
Macau
Years of the 16th century in Macau